Chalk Bluff may refer to:

Chalk Bluff, California, a gold rush town
Chalk Bluff, Arkansas, listed on the National Register of Historic Places in Clay County, Arkansas